Baba Ramdev may refer to:

Ramdev (born 1965), Indian yoga guru, businessman and founder of Patanjali Ayurved
Baba Ramdevji, a folk deity of Rajasthan in India
Baba Ramdev (film), a Rajasthani language movie based on the life of Ramdev